The long-tongued nectar bat (Macroglossus minimus), also known as the northern blossom bat, honey nectar bat, least blossom-bat, dagger-toothed long-nosed fruit bat, and lesser long-tongued fruit bat, is a species of megabat. M. minimus is one of the smallest species in the family Pteropodidae, with an average length of 60–85 mm. It has a reddish-brown colouring with relatively long hair compared to the other species. The hair on the abdomen is a lighter colour, and a dark brown stripe runs bilaterally down the top of the head and back.

Distribution 
Its wide geographical range includes Thailand, Peninsular Malaysia, southern Philippines, Java, Borneo, New Guinea, the Solomon Islands, and northern Australia. In Borneo, it had been recorded from Kota Kinabalu, Sepilok, Sukau, and Tawau in Sabah; Bandar Seri Begawan in Brunei; Bario, Niah and Bako in Sarawak; Gunung Kenepi, Kutai, and Sungai Tengah in Kalimantan.

M. minimus has not been recorded in colonies, which suggest they live in small groups or alone. It feeds on nectar and pollen, which it can obtain from mangroves and banana flowers in Malaysia. Ecologically, the long-tongued nectar bat plays a major role as pollinator of many trees, including the families Bignoniaceae, Bombacaceae, Leguminosae, Musaceae, Myrtaceae, and Sonneratiaceae in peninsular Malaysia. M. minimus has been recorded at elevations up to 1000 m near coastal mangroves, in dipterocarp forests, and in lower montane forests.

Biology 
Of total captures, males constituted 53% and females 47%. About 77% were adults.

Sexually active males have enlarged testes, and polyestrous females have a breeding period of 140 to 160 days. Estimates for the gestation period for M. minimus is approximately 120  days (± 10 days), lactation occurs for 60 to 70 days. In Negros Island, Philippines, females studies produced two or three young per year. The species reproduces aseasonally (throughout the year) and synchronously in response to food abundance.

External measurements 
It is shorter and lighter than Macroglossus sobrinus.

Notes

References

External links 
 Close-ups of M. minimus skulls

Macroglossus
Bats of Southeast Asia
Bats of Oceania
Bats of Australia
Bats of Indonesia
Bats of Malaysia
Mammals of Borneo
Mammals of Brunei
Mammals of Cambodia
Mammals of Papua New Guinea
Mammals of Western New Guinea
Mammals of the Philippines
Mammals of Singapore
Mammals of the Solomon Islands
Mammals of Thailand
Mammals of Vietnam
Mammals of the Northern Territory
Mammals of Queensland
Mammals of Western Australia
Fauna of Java
Least concern biota of Asia
Least concern biota of Oceania
Mammals described in 1810
Taxa named by Étienne Geoffroy Saint-Hilaire
Bats of New Guinea